The 2020 World Outdoor Bowls Championship was to be the 14th edition of the World Championships to be held at the Broadbeach Bowls Club, Musgrave Hill Bowls Club and Club Helensvale on the Gold Coast in Queensland, Australia. There were to be eight events that determined the 2021 world champions, the men's singles, doubles, triples and fours and the women's singles, doubles, triples and fours and in addition there are two overall team winners who receive the Leonard and Taylor trophies respectively. It was originally scheduled from 23 May to 7 June 2020  but the event was officially cancelled on 9 March 2021.

Postponement 
The event followed suit of other sporting events around the world in early 2020, with the outbreak of the COVID-19 (coronavirus) outbreak wreaking havoc across the sporting industry. On March 17, 2020, World Bowls and host organisation Bowls Australia made the decision to postpone the event. Australia's borders were closed to foreign travellers and no time was set as to when the event would be postponed until, due to the uncertain nature of the coronavirus. “We believe this is the right decision to minimise the risk of public exposure to the coronavirus, which the World Health Organisation  recently declared a global pandemic," World Bowls Chief Executive Officer Gary Smith said at the time. On 31 March, it was announced that the event would be held on 25 May to 6 June 2021 but then suffered a further delay with new dates of 7 September to 19 September 2021 being announced.

Cancellation 
Following continual issues surrounding the pandemic the Championships were officially cancelled on 9 March 2021. Furthermore it was decided that the World Championships would take place every two years starting in 2023. This also resulted in the fact that qualifying events for the Championships were no longer required meaning the Atlantic Bowls Championships and Asia Pacific Bowls Championships were terminated.

Participating teams 
There were due to be 36 nations/associations competing at 2021 Championships.

Teams

Men's singles
 Aaron Wilson
 Remmy Kebapetse
 Ryan Bester  
 Robert Paxton 
 Tony Cheung
 Mridul Borgohain
 Gary Kelly 
 Tzvika Hadar
 Ross Davis 
 Fairul Izwan Abd Muin
 Brendan Aquilina 
 Carbous Oliver 
 Shannon McIlroy
 Frederrick Tafatu
 Joe Morgan
 Christopher Dagpin
 Solomona Faamaoni
 Darren Burnett 
 Jason Evans
 Thomas Rodgers  
 Uthen Ontong  
 Charlie Herbert  
 Daniel Salmon  
 Aaron Chilundo

Men's pairs
 Corey Wedlock & Aaron Wilson
 John Gaborutwe & Remmy Kebapetse
 John Bezear & Ryan Bester
 Mao Yongmin & Liu Guoqiang
 Nick Brett & Robert Paxton
 Matt Solway & Matt Le Ber
 Lyndon Sham & Tony Cheung
 Ananda Kumar Narzary & Mridul Borgohain
 Mark Wilson & Marty McHugh 
 Clive McGreal & Mark McGreal
 Derek Boswell & Ross Davis 
 Zulhilmie Redzuan & Fairul Izwan Abd Muin 
 Mark Malogorski & Brendan Aquilina 
 JP Fouche & Carbous Oliver 
 Shannon McIlroy & Gary Lawson
 Hadyn Evans & Ryan Dixon
 Joe Morgan & Matu Bazo
 Rodel Labayo & Leo Carreon
 Paul Foster & Alex Marshall
 Wayne Rittmuller & Jason Evans 
 Woramet Singkeaw & Uthen Ontong  
 Bob Schneider & Charlie Herbert  
 Daniel Salmon & Jonathan Tomlinson
 Myles Hopper & Thomas Craven

Men's triples
 Ricardo Rubinat, Jorge Barreto, Raul Pollet
 Barrie Lester, Aaron Teys, Aron Sherriff
 Rob Law, Greg Wilson, Cam Lefresne
 Meng Zhaoqian, Zhang Baocheng, Ye Suiying
 Robert Manson, Colin Hall, Scott Ferguson
 Andrew Knapper, Jamie Walker, Sam Tolchard
 Kushal Pillay, Rajnesh Prasad, Semesa Naiseruvati
 Maxime Faury, Virgile Machado, Amaury Dumont
 Imen Tang, James Po, Kaho Lee
 Sunil Bahadur, Naveet Rathi Singh, Dinesh Kumar Singh
 Aaron Tennant, Ian McClure, Gary Kelly
 Tzvika Hadar, Danny Slodowik, Allan Saitowitz
 Hirokazu Mori, Hisaharu Satoh, Kenta Hasebe
 Greg Davis, Scott Baxter, Malcolm De Sousa
 Izzat Dzulkeple, Fairus Jabal, Syamil Syazwan Ramli
 Peter Ellul, Troy Lorimer, Shaun Parnis
 Schalk Van Wyk, Steven Peake, Johan Jacobs
 Andrew Kelly, Mike Kernaghan, Ali Forsyth 
 Kenneth Ikirima, Gabriel Simeon, Fred Koesan
 Hommer Mercado, Christopher Dagpin, Ronald Lising
 Ronnie Duncan, Derek Oliver, Darren Burnett
 Prince Neluonde, Charles Mathewson, Pierre Breitenbach
 Loren Dion, James Flower, Neil Furman
 Ross Owen, Chris Klefenz, Steve Harris

Men's fours
 Ricardo Rubinat, Rodolfo Muller, Jorge Barreto, Raul Pollet
 Barrie Lester, Aaron Teys, Corey Wedlock, Aron Sherriff 
 Ajitkumar Naik, Baven Balendra, John Gaborutwe, Binesh Desai
 Rob Law, Greg Wilson, John Bezear, Cam Lefresne 
 Andrew Knapper, Nick Brett, Jamie Walker, Sam Tolchard 
 Imen Tang, Lyndon Sham, James Po, Kaho Lee 
 Ananda Kumar Narzary, Naveet Rathi, Sunil Bahadur,  Dinesh Kumar 
 Aaron Tennant, Mark Wilson, Ian McClure, Marty McHugh 
 Daniel Alonim, Selwyn Hare, Danny Slodowik, Allan Saitowitz
 Tomoyuki Tamachi, Hisaharu Satoh, Jun Koyama, Kenta Hasebe
 Derek Boswell, Scott Baxter, Greg Davis, Malcolm De Sousa 
 Izzat Dzulkeple, Fairus Jabal, Zulhilmie Redzuan, Syamil Syazwan Ramli 
 Peter Ellul, Troy Lorimer, Mark Malogorski, Shaun Parnis 
 JP Fouche, Schalk Van Wyk, Steven Peake, Johan Jacobs 
 Andrew Kelly, Mike Kernaghan, Gary Lawson, Ali Forsyth 
 Michael Godfrey, Gary Bigg, Hadyn Evans, Ryan Dixon
 Kenneth Ikirima, Gabriel Simeon, Matu Bazo, Fred Koesan 
 Hommer Mercado, Rodel Labayo, Leo Carreon, Ronald Lising 
 Ronnie Duncan, Derek Oliver, Paul Foster & Alex Marshall
 Prince Neluonde, Wayne Rittmuller, Charles Mathewson, Pierre Breitenbach 
 Woramet Singkeaw, Sonthi Manakitpaiboon, Wattana Kadkhunthod, Thanakrit Thammasarn
 Loren Dion, Bob Schneider, James Flower, Neil Furman 
 Ross Owen, Chris Klefenz, Steve Harris Jonathan Tomlinson
 Loionel Coventry, Myles Hopper, Clive Robertson, Thomas Craven

Women's singles
 Kelsey Cottrell 
 Lephai Modutlwa
 Kelly McKerihen 
 Miao Xinhong
 Katherine Rednall 
 Litia Tikoisuva
 Cindy Royet
 Lucy Beere
 Helen Cheung 
 Tania Choudhury 
 Catherine Beattie 
 Ruthie Gilor
 Keiko Kurohara
 Siti Zalina Ahmad 
 Bianca Lewis 
 Saskia Schaft
 Jo Edwards 
 Carmen Anderson
 Dee Hoggan
 Tammy Tham Mee Kim
 Colleen Piketh 
 Kannika Limwanich
 Laura Daniels
 Caryn Sinclair

Women's pairs
 Lynsey Clarke & Kelsey Cottrell 
 Joanna Cooper & Jordan Kos
 Katherine Rednall & Ellen Falkner
 Losalini Tukai & Litia Tikoisuva
 Rose Ogier & Lucy Beere
 Cheryl Chan & Angel So 
 Nayanmoni Saikia & Bangita Hazarika
 Ashleigh Rainey & Sarah Kelly
 Ruthie Gilor & Tami Kamzel
 Rachel Macdonald & Fiona Archibald
 Alyani Jamil & Emma Firyana Saroji 
 Rebecca Rixon & Connie-Leigh Rixon
 Amanda Steenkamp & Anjuleen Viljoen 
 Ineke Nagtegaal & Norma Duin
 Tayla Bruce & Jo Edwards 
 Shae Wilson & Christine Jones 
 Piwen Karkar & Catherine Wimp
 Hazel Jagonoy & Rosita Bradborn
 Kay Moran & Stacey McDougall 
 Tammy Tham Mee Kim & Shermeen Lim Xin Yi
 Nici Neal & Colleen Piketh 
 Kannika Limwanich & Patsorn Bryant
 Sara Marie Nicholls & Caroline Taylor
 Caryn Sinclair & Melanie James

Women's triples
 Sara Ines Jaimez, Ana Ramos, Gabriela Villamarin
 Ellen Ryan, Natasha Scott, Rebecca Van Asch
 Hajah Nafsiah Jamal, Dayang Isah Muntol, Hajah Ajijah Muntol
 Jackie Foster, Leanne Chinery, Kelly McKerihen 
 Miao Xinhong, Zheng Fang, Song Suzhen
 Sophie Tolchard, Lorraine Kuhler, Sian Honnor
 Elizabeth Moceiwai, Loretta Kotoisuva, Sheral Mar
 Jackie Nicolle, Gemma Lewin, Lyn Small 
 Shirley Ko, Phyllis Wong, Helen Cheung
 Sarita Tirkey, Tania Choudhury, Rupa Rani Tirkey
 Megan Devlin, Catherine Beattie, Shauna O'Neill
 Syafiqa Haidar Afif Abdul Rahma, Azlina Arshad, Siti Zalina Ahmad
 Irene Attard, Rosemaree Rixon, Tahlia Camilleri
 Elzaan De Vries, Bianca Lewis, Diana Viljoen
 Betty Schiltman, Elly Dollieslager, Saskia Schaft
 Debbie White, Val Smith, Katelyn Inch
 Tracey Wora, Maycee Deszecsar, Carmen Anderson
 Marisa Baronda, Ronalyn Greenlees, Ainie Knight
 Dee Hoggan, Claire Anderson, Lauren Baillie-Whyte
 Bridgett Calitz, Esme Kruger, Johanna Snyman
 Chamaiporn Kotchawong, Palita Gangur, Nannapat Tomak
 Candy DeFazio, Janice Bell, Anne Nunes
 Laura Daniels, Ysie White, Anwen Butten
 Allyson Dale, Heather Singleton, Kerry Craven

Women's fours
 Sara Ines Jaimez, Celia Nunez, Ana Ramos, Gabriela Villamarin
 Ellen Ryan, Lynsey Clarke, Natasha Scott, Rebecca Van Asch 
 Jackie Foster, Joanna Cooper, Jordan Kos, Leanne Chinery
 Sophie Tolchard, Lorraine Kuhler, Ellen Falkner, Sian Honnor
 Losalini Tukai, Elizabeth Moceiwai, Loretta Kotoisuva, Sheral Mar
 Rose Ogier, Jackie Nicolle, Gemma Lewin, Lyn Small 
 Cheryl Chan, Shirley Ko, Phyllis Wong, Angel So
 Sarita Tirkey, Bangita Hazarika, Nayanmoni Saikia, Rupa Rani Tirkey
 Megan Devlin,  Ashleigh Rainey, Sarah Kelly, Shauna O'Neill
 Amalya Levy, Irit Grenchel, Edna Zomberg, Tami Kamzel
 Yoko Goda, Yukie Koyama, Midori Matsuoka, Hiroko Emura
 Jean Holmes, Ethel Southern, Lorraine Bowman, Fiona Archibald
 Alyani Jamil, Syafiqa Haidar Afif Abdul Rahma, Azlina Arshad, Emma Firyana Saroji
 Tahlia Camilleri, Rosemaree Rixon,  Rebecca Rixon, Connie-Leigh Rixon
 Elzaan De Vries, Amanda Steenkamp, Anjuleen Viljoen, Diana Viljoen
 Tayla Bruce, Debbie White, Val Smith, Katelyn Inch
 Tracey Wora, Maycee Deszecsar, Shae Wilson, Christine Jones
 Hazel Jagonoy Ronalyn Greenlees, Ainie Knight, Rosita Bradborn
 Kay Moran, Claire Anderson, Stacey McDougall, Lauren Baillie-Whyte
 Josephine Lim Poh Tin, May Lee Beng Hua, Amira Goh Quee Kee, Shermeen Lim Xin Yi
 Bridgett Calitz, Nici Neal, Esme Kruger, Johanna Snyman 
 Chamaiporn Kotchawong, Nannapat Tomak, Palita Gangur, Patsorn Bryant
 Sara Marie Nicholls, Caroline Taylor, Ysie White, Anwen Butten
 Allyson Dale, Melanie James, Heather Singleton, Kerry Craven

References

 
World Outdoor Bowls Championship
Bowls in Australia
Sports competitions on the Gold Coast, Queensland
2021 in Australian sport
2021 in bowls
International sports competitions hosted by Australia
World Outdoor Bowls Championship
World Outdoor Bowls Championship
2020 in Australian sport
2020 in bowls